The 2012–13 Surrey Heat season is the franchise's 8th season in the British Basketball League. It's the first season since being renamed as the Surrey Heat, having previously been called the Guildford Heat.

The Surrey Heat got their season off to the best possible start at the Surrey Sports Park when they comprehensively defeated the visiting Mersey Tigers. The final score was 106-45, which set all sorts of Heat franchise records. The Heat surpassed last year’s highest score (which was 100, against an under-strength Newcastle Eagles in the last regular season game). In fact, it was the second highest output by the Heat in over three seasons and fell one point short of the most points scored against the Tigers, when the (then) Guildford Heat beat the (then) Everton Tigers 107-101 in the 2008-09 season.
 
However, it was the defensive performance which set the records tumbling. The 61 point margin of victory is a franchise high, easily surpassing the 49 point margin of victory achieved back in the 2007-08 season, when the Heat defeated the Worthing Thunder, 118-69, in the BBL Trophy (the Heat’s highest-scoring game). The 45 points conceded was also a franchise low, beating the 52 points allowed in the 2009-10 season when the Heat notched up an 85-52 victory over the London Capital.

BBL Championship

September 2012

October 2012

November 2012

December 2012

January 2013

February 2013

March 2013

April 2013

BBL Cup

The Surrey Heat suffered a hard-fought 74-79 loss against the visiting Plymouth Raiders in the BBL Cup Quarter Final. And, to add injury to insult, they lost star player Martelle McLemore to an ankle injury in the second quarter. The Heat were led by Chavis Holmes’ 20 points to go with his eight assists. Frank Holmes added 17 points and nine rebounds to go with four blocks and Sam Cricelli had 14 points and seven rebounds.

BBL Trophy

The Heat ran out 86-68 winners against the Reading Rockets in the round of 16, with Albert Margai leading the way with 16 points. In his last game for the Heat, Travis Holmes scored 15 points to go with his seven steals.

The Guildford Heat were led by Julius Joseph's 16 points, in the QF loss to the Leicester Riders. Chavis Holmes and Albert Margai had 12 each, and Frank Holmes had 17 rebounds. The Leicester Riders converted more than 50% of their shots. Jay Couisnard lead the way for the visitors with 22 points and seven rebounds.

BBL Playoffs

See also
 Basketball in England
 British Basketball League
 BBL Cup
 BBL Trophy

Surrey 
Surrey Heat